Biggings is a village on the island of Papa Stour, in Shetland, Scotland. Papa Stour's church is situated at the south of Biggings. A homestead of Duke Haakon of Norway is thought to have been at Biggings, and archaeological digs have discovered the remains of a substantial Norse house, dating to around the 12th or 13th century. A partial reconstruction of a Norse building has also been undertaken.

References

External links

Canmore - Papa Stour, Biggings Norse House site record

Villages in Shetland